Cole Byers (born April 16, 1983) is a Canadian former professional ice hockey defenceman.

Byers played the 2006–07 and 2007–08 seasons with the Hull Stingrays of the British Elite Ice Hockey League (EIHL).

His brother Dane Byers is a forward who has played in the National Hockey League with the New York Rangers and Columbus Blue Jackets.

References

External links

1983 births
Living people
Canadian ice hockey defencemen
Hull Stingrays players
Ice hockey people from Saskatchewan
Moose Jaw Warriors players
People from Nipawin, Saskatchewan
Quebec RadioX players
Trenton Titans players
Victoria Salmon Kings players
Canadian expatriate ice hockey players in England